At the 2010 South Asian Games, the athletics events were held at the Bangabandhu National Stadium in Dhaka, Bangladesh from February 6 to February 9. A total of 23 events were contested, of which 15 by male and 8 by female athletes.

India (10 golds) had the greatest medal haul of the six countries which reached the medal table, shortly followed by Sri Lanka (8 golds). Stand out performers included Chandrika Subashini, who took the 200/400 metres double, and Pakistan's Naseem Hameed, who was a rank outsider before the games but won the women's 100 metres race over more-fancied opposition. Following her victory, the Senate of Pakistan passed a resolution to improve her family's poor living standards and reward her with professional training.

The marathon race caused much controversy as Rajendra Bahadur Bhandari, returning from a doping violation from the 2006 South Asian Games, finished in first place. Furthermore, a miscalculation caused by a change in finishing location resulted in a course of only 35 km (over 5 km short of the true marathon distance). Following an investigation, the athletes' positions remained unchanged, although their times were barred from the record books.

Records

Medal summary

Men

Women

Medal table

References

External links
Official 2010 South Asian Games athletics page (archived)

2010 South Asian Games
South Asian Games
2010 South Asian Games